Tarvarius Brennan Moore (born August 16, 1996) is an American football strong safety for the Green Bay Packers of the National Football League (NFL). He played college football at Southern Miss.

College career
Moore played two years at Pearl River Community College before transferring to the University of Southern Mississippi.  Moore signed with Southern Miss over other schools including Arkansas State, Louisville, Middle Tennessee, Minnesota and Nebraska.  Moore did not make any starts during his first year at Southern Miss, being fourth on the depth chart behind three seniors.  Despite this, he played all 13 games and tied the team lead for interceptions with two.  During his senior season, Moore became a starter and led the team in tackles and interceptions.

Professional career
Moore did not receive an invitation to attend the NFL Scouting Combine in Indianapolis. On March 29, 2018, he attended Southern Mississippi's pro day and performed all of the combine and positional drills. At the conclusion of the pre-draft process, Moore was projected to be a third round pick by NFL draft experts and scouts. He was ranked as the fourth best free safety prospect in the draft by DraftScout.com and was ranked the tenth best cornerback in the draft by Scouts Inc.

San Francisco 49ers
The San Francisco 49ers drafted Moore in the third round (95th overall) of the 2018 NFL Draft. Moore was the tenth cornerback drafted in 2018. The pick used to draft Moore was traded from the New England Patriots in exchange for Trent Brown.

On May 5, 2018, the San Francisco 49ers signed Moore to a four-year, $3.35 million contract that includes a signing bonus of $784,371.

In Super Bowl LIV against the Kansas City Chiefs, Moore recorded an interception off a pass thrown by Patrick Mahomes which was deflected off the arm of wide receiver Tyreek Hill during the 31–20 loss. In 2020, Moore played in all 16 games, and started 8.

In June 2021, Moore suffered a ruptured Achilles' tendon during practice. He was placed on the reserve/PUP list on August 31, 2021.

Green Bay Packers
On March 17, 2023, Moore was signed by the Green Bay Packers.

References

External links
Green Bay Packers bio
Southern Miss Golden Eagles bio

1996 births
Living people
People from Quitman, Mississippi
Players of American football from Mississippi
American football safeties
Pearl River Wildcats football players
Southern Miss Golden Eagles football players
San Francisco 49ers players
Green Bay Packers players